This is a list of counties in North Dakota. There are 53 counties in the U.S. state of North Dakota.

The Federal Information Processing Standard (FIPS) code, which is used by the United States government to uniquely identify states and counties, is provided with each entry. North Dakota's code is 38, which when combined with any county code would be written as 38XXX. The FIPS code for each county links to census data for that county.

List

|}

See also
 Geography of North Dakota
 North Dakota Association of Counties

References

 
North Dakota, counties in
Counties